The 1968 NAIA World Series was the 12th annual tournament hosted by the National Association of Intercollegiate Athletics to determine the national champion of baseball among its member colleges and universities in the United States and Canada.

The tournament was played at Phil Welch Stadium in St. Joseph, Missouri.

William Jewell (30-15) defeated Georgia Southern (32-21) in the championship series, 4–3, to win the Cardinals' first NAIA World Series.

William Jewell pitcher Rich Stonum was named tournament MVP.

Bracket

See also
 1968 NCAA University Division baseball tournament
 1968 NCAA College Division baseball tournament

Reference

NAIA World Series
NAIA World Series
NAIA World Series